The Ashville Historic District in Ashville, Alabama is a historic district that was listed on the National Register of Historic Places in 2005.  In 2005, it included 122 contributing buildings plus one other contributing site and one other contributing object.

References

National Register of Historic Places in St. Clair County, Alabama
Historic districts in St. Clair County, Alabama
Historic districts on the National Register of Historic Places in Alabama